Saudareos is a genus of parrot in the family Psittaculidae.

Taxonomy
The genus Saudareos was introduced in 2020 for a clade of lorikeets that form a sister clade to Eos. The type species is the ornate lorikeet. The genus name combines the Indonesian language "saudara" meaning "sister" with the genus name Eos. The genus contains three species which were formerly assigned to Trichoglossus and one that was assigned to Psitteuteles.
The genus contains the following five species:
 Mindanao lorikeet (Saudareos johnstoniae) – formerly placed in Trichoglossus Sula lorikeet (Saudareos flavoviridis) – formerly placed in Trichoglossus Yellow-cheeked lorikeet (Saudareos meyeri) – split from S. flavoviridis Ornate lorikeet (Saudareos ornata) – formerly placed in Trichoglossus Iris lorikeet (Saudareos iris) – formerly placed in Psitteuteles''

References

 
Bird genera